This is a list of cricket players who have played representative cricket for Basnahira in Sri Lanka. Basnahira cricket team was founded in 2011.

It includes players that have played at least one match, in senior First-Class, List A cricket, or Twenty20 matches. Practice matches are not included, unless they have officially been classified at First-class tour matches.

The Inter-Provincial Cricket Tournament is the premier domestic cricket competition in Sri Lanka. It was founded in 1990.

First Class Players
Basnahira is yet to play any First-Class matches.

List 'A' Players
All of the Players who have represented Basnahira in List A cricket domestic one day competitions:

Twenty20 Players
All of the Players who have represented Basnahira in Twenty20 domestic competitions:

External links
Players Who Have Played For Basnahira
Sri Lanka Cricket

Basnahira cricketers
Basnahira